The Directorate-General for Trade (DG TRADE) is a Directorate-General of the European Commission. The European Commission's Directorate-
General for Trade (DG Trade) develops and implements the EU's trade policy in order to help secure prosperity, solidarity and security in Europe and around the globe. It covers a wide area from manufactured goods to services, intellectual property and investment.

As of 1 June 2019 Sabine Weyand is the Director-General. The DG Trade reports to the Trade Commissioner.

Under the authority in the von der Leyen Commission of Executive-Vice President Valdis Dombrovskis, the European Commissioner for Trade, DG TRADE coordinates trade relations between the European Union (EU) and the rest of the world.

Organisation
European Commissioner for Trade
Director General
Directorate A - Multilateral Affairs, Strategy, Analysis, Evaluation
Unit A1 - Multilateral affairs and WTO
Unit A2 - Trade Strategy
Unit A3 - Chief Economist, Trade Analysis and Evaluation
Deputy Director General
Directorate  B - Asia (I), Services and Digital Trade, Investment and Intellectual Property
Unit B1 - Far East
Unit B2 - Services and Digital Trade
Unit B3 - Investment and Intellectual Property
Unit B001 - Trade Section in the EU Delegation to China
Unit B002 - Trade Section in the EU Delegation to Japan
Directorate  C - Africa, Caribbean and Pacific, Asia (II), Trade and Sustainable Development, Green Deal 
Unit C1 - African, Caribbean and Pacific, Overseas Countries and Territories
Unit C2 - South and South East Asia, Australia, New Zealand
Unit C3 - Bilateral relations in Trade and Sustainable Development, Generalised Scheme of Preferences
Unit C4 - Multilateral Trade and Sustainable Development Policy, Green Deal, Conflict Minerals
Deputy Director General
Directorate  D - The Americas, Agriculture and Food Safety
Unit D1 - US, Canada
Unit D2 - Latin America
Unit D3 - Agriculture, Food and Sanitary and Phytosanitary matters
Unit D001 - Trade Section in the EU Delegation to the US
Directorate E - Neighbouring Countries, Industry, Goods, Regulatory Cooperation and Public Procurement
Unit E1 - Europe and Eastern Neighbourhood
Unit E2 - Southern neighbours, Middle East, Turkey, Russia and Central Asia
Unit E3 - Industry, Goods, Energy, Customs and Origin
Unit E4 - Regulatory cooperation and Public procurement
Deputy Director General
Directorate F - Enforcement, Market Access, SMEs, Legal affairs, Technology and Security
Unit F1 - Single entry point for enforcement, Market access and SMEs
Unit F2 - Dispute Settlement and Legal aspects of trade policy
Unit F3 - Legal aspects of trade and sustainable development and investment
Unit F4 - Technology and Security, FDI Screening
Directorate G - Trade Defence
Unit G1 - General Policy, WTO Relations, Relations with Industry
Unit G2 - Investigations I. Relations with Member States for Trade Defence matters
Unit G3 - Investigations II. Anti-circumvention
Unit G4 - Investigations III. Monitoring of implementation
Unit G5 - Investigations IV. Relations with third countries for Trade Defence matters
Directorate R - Resources, Inter-Institutional Relations, Communications and Civil Society
Unit R1 - Resources, HR Business Correspondent and Planning
Unit R2 - Interinstitutional Relations, Policy and Briefing Coordination
Unit R3 - Transparency, Civil Society and Communication
Unit R4 - Information technology and IT systems

See also
World Trade Organization
General Agreement on Tariffs and Trade

References

External links
Directorate-General for Trade
Access to Markets portal
EU Trade Policy

Trade